Shabir Choudhry is a British national and a Kashmiri leader, rights and peace activist, politician, academician and writer. He helped form the Kashmir Youth Movement in 1973, the Jammu and Kashmir Liberation Front in 1976 and later on the Kashmir National Party in 2008. He resigned from each of these after being discouraged or opposed to the direction they were headed. He went to United Kingdom in 1966 where he continues his struggle against forces of occupation, terrorism, extremism and religious intolerance in Azad Kashmir and Kashmir through regular statements, articles, press releases, conference and videos. He is a British national as well as a Pakistani/Kashmiri national.

Political Life 
 Founder member of JKLF Jammu Kashmir Liberation Front
 Spokesman Kashmir National Party and Director Diplomatic Committee
 Chairman South Asia Watch
 Founder member and Director Institute of Kashmir Affairs
 Regularly takes part in the Sessions of the UN Human Rights Commission in Geneva
 Has addressed seminars and conferences in the British Parliament, European Parliament and other important capitals of the world on issue of Kashmir, violence and terrorism
 Addressed at Cambridge University as a Chief Guest in a conference on Kashmir in 1990.

Controversy 
He has been accused by the Inter Services Intelligence (ISI), Pakistan's Intelligence Agency, of being tasked by India's foreign intelligence agency, the Research and Analysis Wing (RAW), of trying to ‘sabotage’ the China Pakistan Economic Corridor (CPEC) project as well as other activities against the state of Pakistan. The Asian Human Rights Commission (AHRC) came out in support of Shabir Choudhry during this controversy.
Shabir Choudhry challenged the authorities in Islamabad High Court to prove allegations made against him. After two and half years long trial the authorities, including ISI could not provide any evidence to support their contentions. The High Court ordered the authorities to renew his Identity card. Dr Shabir Choudhry proved to be an innocent person.

Publications

English 

 Kashmir Dispute: A Kashmiri perspective - Kashmiri struggle transformed in to Jihad, terrorism and a proxy war
 Tribal Invasion and Kashmir: Pakistani Attempts to Capture Kashmir in 1947, Division of Kashmir and Terrorism
 Terrorism, Kashmir Dispute and Possible Solutions: Rise of Jihadi Culture, Extremism and the Peace Process
 Kashmir and the Partition of India
 Kashmir Dispute and Peace in South Asia
 Azad Kashmir and Gilgit Baltistan
 Are Kashmiris Part of the Kashmir Dispute?
 Liberation Struggle, Jihad or a Proxy War: Nature of struggle in former Princely State of Jammu and Kashmir
 Kashmir Dispute: New Dimensions and New Challenges: Emerging Threats of Religious Intolerance, Terrorism, Regionalism and Outside Interference

Urdu 
 Fareena
 Bay-Khataa - about the problems of Asian youths living in UK published in 1983.
 Pakistan and Kashmiri struggle for independence
 Is an independent Kashmir a conspiracy?

See also 
 Kashmir Conflict
 Hashim Qureshi

References

External links 
 http://drshabirchoudhry.blogspot.in/

Living people
Jammu and Kashmir academics
Jammu and Kashmir politicians
Jammu Kashmir Liberation Front
People from Azad Kashmir
People from Bhimber District
Pakistani activists
Writers from Jammu and Kashmir
Year of birth missing (living people)